The Small Jamuna River is a river in North Bengal, Bangladesh. In 2007, it was observed that the river might merge with the Jamuna River. It passes through Joypurhat and Naogaon

References 

Rivers of Bangladesh
Rivers of Rajshahi Division